Robert Hardy Smith (March 21, 1813 – March 13, 1878) was an American politician who served as a senior officer of the Confederate States Army during the American Civil War.

Early life and career 
Smith was born in Camden County, North Carolina on March 21, 1813, and later moved to Alabama. In Alabama, Smith served in the state's House of Representatives in 1849 and the Alabama Senate in 1851. At the onset of the American Civil War, Smith was elected to represent the State of Alabama in the Provisional Confederate Congress from 1861 to 1862. He later served as a Colonel of the 36th Alabama Infantry Regiment. In an 1861 speech, Smith stated that Alabama declared its secession from the Union over the issue of slavery, which he referred to as "the negro quarrel". In the speech, he praised the Confederate Constitution for its un-euphemistic protections of the right to own slaves:

Death 
Smith died in Mobile, Alabama on March 13, 1878, and was buried at the Magnolia Cemetery.

References

External links 

 
 Robert Hardy Smith at The Political Graveyard

1813 births
1878 deaths
19th-century American politicians
Alabama state senators
Deputies and delegates to the Provisional Congress of the Confederate States
Members of the Alabama House of Representatives
Signers of the Confederate States Constitution
Signers of the Provisional Constitution of the Confederate States